Tatiana Germanovna Vlasova (born 21 May 1977) is a Russian ski-orienteering competitor and world champion. She received nine gold medals at the World Ski Orienteering Championships from 2000 to 2009. She won the overall World Cup in Ski Orienteering in 2007/8, and finished 2nd in 2001, 2003 and 2006.

References

External links
 Tatiana Vlasova at World of O Runners

1977 births
Living people
Russian orienteers
Female orienteers
Ski-orienteers